Terry Kern (born 26 April 1954) is an American former ski jumper who competed in the 1976 Winter Olympics.

References

1954 births
Living people
American male ski jumpers
Olympic ski jumpers of the United States
Ski jumpers at the 1976 Winter Olympics
Place of birth missing (living people)